Annabel Mullion (born 1969) is an actress. She was educated at St Mary's School, Ascot and studied English and Drama at the University of East Anglia. She then completed the 3 year acting course at Central School of Speech and Drama, graduating in 1994. She won the Carleton Hobbs Bursary Award in that year as well.

Her films include Carrington  (1995, dir Christopher Hampton), Mission: Impossible (1996, dir Brian De Palma), Me Without You (2001, dir Sandra Goldbacher), A Christmas Carol (dir David Jones), Scooterman, and Mother's Milk (2012, dir Gerald Fox) for which she received Best Supporting Actress at Monaco Film Festival 2013 for her role as Mary Melrose.

In 2006 she played Lady Tara Butler in Midsomer Murders “Vixen’s Run”. She also appeared in Emma a TV Mini-Series in 2009 as Mrs Woodhouse. 

She has had many parts in television including Law and Order UK, Doll and Em, Agatha Christie's Poirot, Breathless, Wallander, Midsomer Murders and Lewis.

In 2012 she appeared in the TV Series Lewis “The Soul of Genius” as Thea Falconer. In 2013 she appeared in Agatha Christie’s Poirot “Elephants Can Remember” as Lady Ravenscroft, in Doll & Em “Six” as Woman with Lurchers and in Breathless a TV Mini-Series as Duchess.

Her theatre parts include a nine-month run as Shelia in An Inspector Calls directed by Stephen Daldry, Lydia Languish in The Rivals directed by Braham Murray, and Lady Mary in The White Carnation directed by Knight Mantel. In 2019 she appeared in Bodies by James Saunders (playwright)

From 1996 to 2004 Annabel was the muse of Lucian Freud who created three paintings of her, including Annabel and Rattler 1997-1998. She also appeared in Malcolm Venville's book of advertising, celebrity, fashion, and personal photography, Layers.

References

External links

1969 births
Living people
People educated at St Mary's School, Ascot
Alumni of the University of East Anglia
English film actresses
English television actresses
20th-century English actresses
21st-century English actresses